Yusefabad (also Romanized as Yūsefābād, Yūsofābād, and Yoosof Abad; also known as Vīskeh Āqā Yūsof and Yusufabad) is a village in Nowsher-e Koshk-e Bijar Rural District, Khoshk-e Bijar District, Rasht County, Gilan Province, Iran. At the 2006 census, its population was 326, in 90 families.

References 

Populated places in Rasht County